Port au Port is a small Canadian rural community located in the western part of the island of Newfoundland. Port au Port is situated on the isthmus connecting the main part of the island of Newfoundland to the Port au Port Peninsula to the west, with Isthmus Bay being to the south.  Port au Port is located on Route 460, several kilometres west of the town of Stephenville and the village of Kippens, at its intersection with Route 462. It was originally named Gravels. It had a population of 505 in 1940 and 214 by 1956. Port au Port is located with the town limits of Port au Port East.

See also
 List of communities in Newfoundland and Labrador

Populated places in Newfoundland and Labrador